James Fisk (October 4, 1763November 17, 1844) was an American politician from Vermont. He served in the House of Representatives and the United States Senate.

Early life
Fisk was born in Greenwich, Province of Massachusetts Bay, the son of Stephen Fisk and Anna Bradish.  His father died when Fisk was a year old, and he was largely self-educated.  As a teenager, he worked on his family's farm.

Start of career

Military service
He served in the Revolutionary War from 1779 to 1782 as a private in Captain Willis' Company, Colonel Brooks' Regiment, a unit of the Massachusetts Militia.

Post-American Revolution
After the war, he was a farmer in Greenwich. In 1785, Fisk served as a member of the Massachusetts General Court. Fisk was ordained as a Universalist minister, and preached occasionally. He married Priscilla West in 1786.

Move to Vermont
In 1798, Fisk moved to what is now Barre City, Vermont, but was then a village in the Town of Barre. While owning and operating a farm, Fisk received his credentials as a Universalist minister and began to preach. He also studied law, was admitted to the bar, and began the practice of law as the first attorney in Barre.  In 1799 he was elected to the town's board of selectmen.

Fisk represented Barre in the Vermont House of Representatives from 1800 to 1805, 1809 to 1810 and in 1815. He was judge of the Orange County, Vermont Court from 1802 to 1809 and in 1816. In 1803, he was Orange County's member of the commission to choose a permanent site for the state capital, which selected Montpelier  In 1804, he served as chairman of the commission that attempted to settle the question of the Vermont-Canada boundary.

Congressman
In 1804, Fisk was elected to the United States House of Representatives as a Democratic-Republican. He was reelected in 1806, and served two terms, March 4, 1805 to March 3, 1809. He ran unsuccessfully for reelection in 1808.

In 1810, Fiske was elected again to the House. He was reelected in 1812, and served from March 4, 1811 to March 3, 1815. He was chairman of the Committee on Elections.

Fisk was appointed United States Judge for the Territory of Indiana in 1812 by President James Madison, but declined the appointment. He was a delegate to the state constitutional convention in 1814, and served as judge of the Supreme Court of Vermont from 1815 to 1816.

U.S. Senator
In 1817, Fisk was elected to the United States Senate to fill the vacancy caused by the resignation of Dudley Chase. He served from November 4, 1817 until resigning on January 8, 1818 to become U.S. collector of customs for the district of Vermont.  He served from 1818 until 1826, moved to Swanton, Vermont in 1819 so that he could be closer to the border with Canada and the crossing points where customs were paid.

Death
Fisk died in Swanton on November 17, 1844. He was interred at the Church Street Cemetery in Swanton.

Family
Following his Revolutionary War service, Fisk married Priscilla West (1763–1840).

Fisk's daughter Parma was the wife of Orlando Stevens, who served as Fisk's deputy collector, and was later a member of the legislatures of both Vermont and Minnesota.

References

Further reading
 "Gazetteer of Washington County, Vt., 1783–1889" by William Adams, The Syracuse Journal Company Printers, 1899

External links 
 
 Biographical Directory of the United States Congress
 
 govtrack.us: Sen. James Fisk
 The Political Graveyard: James Fisk (1763-1844) 

1763 births
1844 deaths
People from Greenwich, Massachusetts
Members of the Universalist Church of America
Members of the Vermont House of Representatives
United States senators from Vermont
Democratic-Republican Party United States senators
Justices of the Vermont Supreme Court
Democratic-Republican Party members of the United States House of Representatives from Vermont